Maude Storey, CBE, FRCN (24 March 1930 – 29 March 2003) was a British nurse, nursing administrator  and writer, as well as President of the Royal College of Nursing from 1988 to 1990.

Career
Storey was born at Wigan, where she attended the Wigan and District Mining and Technical College, After training in Manchester, she went to London to qualify as a midwife.

She then returned to Wigan and was named clinical instructor at Wigan Infirmary (1959–68) as well as a member of the Wigan Health Authority. After serving as a regional nursing officer for the Mersey Regional Health Authority, she was appointed registrar of the General Nursing Council of England and Wales (1977–81); she would be the last such registrar, and the first chief executive of its successor, the Central Council for Nursing, Midwifery and Health Visiting (1981–87).

Personal life
Never married, Storey was a devout Methodist. She suffered from diabetes although no official cause was given in the news reports of her death, which came five days after her 73rd birthday in Reading, Berkshire in 2003.

Index of writings by Maude Storey
 Operation and education in home health care service: A study on home health care services in a hospital: Wonju Christian Hospital
 Operation and education in home health care service: Operational research on the development of a hospital based home health care program
 Development of a new statutory structure for nursing, midwifery and health visiting in the United Kingdom
 Nurse education conference: meeting society's requirements
 Nurses must take the professional conduct code seriously
 UK Central Council elections: why bother?
 Your profession needs you: determining our destiny
 Keeping an eye on care

References

1930 births
2003 deaths
British civil servants
British medical writers
Women medical writers
British Methodists
English nurses
British nursing administrators
Commanders of the Order of the British Empire
British midwives
People from Wigan
Fellows of the Royal College of Nursing
Presidents of the Royal College of Nursing
British nurses